"All Signs Point to Lauderdale" is the second single from A Day to Remember's fourth album, What Separates Me from You, released on June 7, 2011.

Music and lyrics
Lead vocalist, Jeremy McKinnon wrote the lyrics, while the music was written by Tom Denney, McKinnon, guitarist Kevin Skaff, producer Chad Gilbert and A Day to Remember. The title came from an occasion when McKinnon and bassist Joshua Woodard were in a rough neighborhood in West Palm Beach, Florida. The pair were walking down Drexel Road in the early hours of the morning; they looked up to notice signs saying "Fort Lauderdale". In an interview with PopCrush in 2011, McKinnon said "All Signs Point to Lauderdale" was when you get the "feeling like you're stuck in a place that's leading you nowhere" and "standing up for yourself and taking charge of your life." The song talks "about being young and stuck in a town that you feel like you don't belong in. Sometimes, you feel like you want to get away from everything and everybody and do your own thing."

Release and reception
The song impacted radio on May 24, 2011. The music video for the song was filmed in one day in Los Angeles when the group had a day-off from touring. The idea for which came from the band's management. The music video premiered on MTV2 on June 7, 2011. "All Signs Point to Lauderdale" charted on both Billboards Hot Modern Rock Tracks and Rock Songs charts, at number 32 and number 48, respectively. The track was voted as number 10 in the "10 Best Rock Songs of 2011" by AOL Radio. "All Signs Point to Lauderdale" is available as downloadable content for Rock Band games. The song was included on Warped Tour 2011 Tour Compilation. Rick Florino of Artistdirect called the song "incisive and infectious".

Track listing
Digital download
"All Signs Point to Lauderdale" – 3:17

Promotional CD
"All Signs Point to Lauderdale (Radio Edit)" – 3:17

Chart positions

Personnel
Personnel per album booklet.

A Day to Remember
Jeremy McKinnon — vocals
Joshua Woodard — bass
Neil Westfall — rhythm guitar
Alex Shelnutt — drums 
Kevin Skaff — lead guitar, backing vocals

Production
Chad Gilbert — producer
Andrew Wade and Jeremy McKinnon — co-producers
Dan Korneff — mixing engineer
Ted Jensen — mastering engineer
Andrew Wade — engineer

References

A Day to Remember songs
2011 singles
Song recordings produced by Andrew Wade
Song recordings produced by Chad Gilbert
Song recordings produced by Jeremy McKinnon
Songs written by Jeremy McKinnon
Songs written by Tom Denney
Songs written by Chad Gilbert
Victory Records singles
2010 songs